Samurai Flamenco is an anime television series produced by Manglobe. The series focuses on a young man named Masayoshi Hazama, who takes on the superhero persona of Samurai Flamenco to fight crime in the streets. The series, directed by Takahiro Omori and written by Hideyuki Kurata, aired on Fuji TV's noitamina programming block between October 10, 2013 and March 27, 2014 and was simulcast by Crunchyroll. The series is licensed by Aniplex of America in North America, Anime Limited in the United Kingdom, and Madman Entertainment in Australia.

Episode list
Episodes 6, 8, 12, 15, 17, 19 and 20 were written by Takahiro. All other episodes were written by Hideyuki Kurata.

Samurai Flamenco